Azerbaijan University of Languages is a public university in Baku, Azerbaijan. The student body consists of approximately 4,000 undergraduates and 900 graduate (master's degree) students. The university has a combined faculty of more than 700 teachers.

Azerbaijan University of Languages is the first higher education institution that has implemented the flexible credit system that meets the requirements of the Bologna process, International Quality Assurance standards and the European Credit Transfer System (ECTS) in Azerbaijan since 2005. At the same time, the Azerbaijan University of Languages is one of the first universities to have the status of a public legal entity under the Ministry of Education of the Republic of Azerbaijan since 2017.

History
The beginnings of the university can be traced to 1937, with Azerbaijan Pedagogical Institute's opening of the School of Foreign Languages. In 1940, the Azerbaijan Communist Party decreed that a separate Institute of Foreign Languages be formed, but the outbreak of World War II caused the new institute to quickly fold back into Azerbaijan Pedagogical Institute.  After the war, the government of Azerbaijan SSR created the Azerbaijan Institute of Foreign Languages in 1948, but it was folded into the Azerbaijan Institute of Russian Language and Literature in 1959. Finally, in 1973, the Azerbaijan Pedagogical Institute of Foreign Languages was established as an independent institution. In 1996 the school was renamed the Azerbaijan State Institute of Languages. In 2000 the institute was given university status and renamed as the Azerbaijan University of Languages.

The university maintains close relations with UNESCO, operating a UNESCO Translation Department as well as hosting a UNESCO-sponsored faculty chair.
There are 7 schools, 25 departments at the university, a lot of scientific centers, laboratories activate at present.

As a result of the educational reforms, Azerbaijan University of Languages has been the first university which transmitted the whole system to credit system. The university has cooperation with higher educational institutions of Turkey, the U.S., the United Kingdom, France and other European institutions. Student exchanges have been intensive thanks to those cooperation.

Events 

 A series of events dedicated to the Khojaly Massacre were held at AUL by the Faculty of International Relations and Management and the Faculty of Translation and Cultural Studies.
 Rector of AUL met with delegation of Indonesia on December 17, 2018. The delegations of both sides signed a memorandum of cooperation.

Structure 
The structure of the university consists of the following:

 Rector
 Prorectors/vice-rectors
 for academic affairs
 for scientific affairs
 for international relations
 for developmental affairs
 for general affairs
 Rector's advisors
 for issues of scientific and educational affairs
 for issues of multiculturalism
 for the logistics and financial issues
 for the control of execution
 for social affairs

Departments of university 

 School of International Relations and Regional Studies 
 School of Philology and Journalism 
 School of Translation 
 School of Further Education

Notable graduates 
 Novruz Mammadov –  9th prime minister of Azerbaijan
 Azad Rahimov – Minister of Youth and Sports of Azerbaijan
 Abulfas Garayev – Minister of Culture and Tourism of Azerbaijan
 Valeh Hajilar - Academic of Tbilisi State Pedagogical University and National Academy of Sciences of Georgia, professor
Garry Kasparov – Chess grandmaster
Aysel Teymurzadeh – Singer
Vagif Sadigov – Azerbaijani ambassador  to the United Nations

References

External links 

 

 
Universities and institutes established in the Soviet Union
Educational institutions established in 1973
1973 establishments in Azerbaijan
1973 establishments in the Soviet Union